Chatham-Kent (2021 population: 104,316) is a single-tier municipality in Southwestern Ontario, Canada. Mostly rural, its population centres are Chatham, Wallaceburg, Tilbury, Blenheim, Ridgetown, Wheatley and Dresden. The current Municipality of Chatham-Kent was created in 1998 by the amalgamation of Blenheim, Bothwell, Camden, city of Chatham, township of Chatham, Dover, Dresden, Erie Beach, Erieau, Harwich, Highgate, Howard, Orford, Raleigh, Ridgetown, Rodney, Thamesville, Tilbury East, Tilbury, Wallaceburg, Wheatley and Zone.

The Chatham-Kent census division, which includes the independent Delaware Nation at Moraviantown First Nation, had a population of 102,042 in the 2016 census.

History 
The area of Chatham-Kent is part of the traditional territory of the Odawa, Potawatomi, Ojibwe and Wyandot First Nations of Canada. After the Treaty of Paris in 1763 ceded control of the area from the French to the British, it became part of the Territory of Quebec. The title to the Chatham-Kent area was surrendered to the British as part of the 1790 McKee's Purchase, (named for Alexander McKee) to provide land for settlers. McKee's Purchase was designated an Event of National Historic Significance in Canada in 1931. A historical plaque for the purchase is located in Blenheim Park in Blenheim. Indigenous persons remain resident in the area today at the Delaware Nation at Moraviantown and Walpole Island First Nation.

European settlement of the former city of Chatham area began with a naval dockyard in 1792, at the mouth of the Thames River. The town was named after William Pitt, 1st Earl of Chatham.  It was built as a naval dockyard, a characteristic shared by Chatham, Kent, England. In England, the name Chatham came from the British root ceto and the Old English ham thus meaning a forest settlement. Following the American Revolution and the Gnadenhutten massacre, a group of Christian Munsee settled in what is now the Moraviantown reserve. In the War of 1812, the Battle of the Thames took place between Moraviantown and Thamesville on October 5, 1813.

Black population
During the 19th century, the area was the northern terminus of the Underground Railroad. As a result, Chatham-Kent is now part of the African-Canadian Heritage Tour. Josiah Henson Museum for African-Canadian History, formally known as Uncle Tom's Cabin Historic Site is a museum of the Dawn Settlement, established in 1841 by Josiah Henson near Dresden as refuge for the many slaves who escaped to Canada from the United States. John Brown, the abolitionist, planned his raid on the Harpers Ferry Arsenal in Chatham and recruited local men to participate in the raid. He held in Chatham a Convention of Colored Men on May 8–10, 1858. The small village of North Buxton, part of the African Canadian Heritage Tour, also played an important role in the Underground Railroad. By the 1850s, the city of Chatham was referred to as the "black mecca of Canada". A museum in the city, the Black Mecca Museum, still bears this name. Chatham was home to a number of black churches and business, with Black Canadians making up one-third of the city's population and controlling a significant portion of the city's political power. Nearby Dresden and Buxton were also home to thousands of land-owning black residents. However, after the abolition of slavery in the United States, many black families left the area. Today the city of Chatham is just 3.3% black, with Chatham-Kent as a whole being 2.1% black. Few of the black-owned institutions are still in operation.

After slavery ended in the United States
In 1846, the town of Chatham had a population of about 1,500, with part of the town being called Chatham North. There were four churches, a theatre, a weekly newspaper and a cricket club. The road between London and Amherstburg was open, and transportation by stagecoach was available. A fast boat also provided transportation to Detroit and Buffalo. Chatham had many tradesman, a foundry, two banks, three schools, a tavern and a library where one could read books and newspapers. By 1869, the population was 3,000 in this industrial area with several mills, foundries, and breweries; a great deal of wood was being produced. A steamboat offered transportation to Windsor and Detroit. There was one bank office.

Between 1906 and 1909, the city was home to the Chatham Motor Car Company, and from 1919 to 1921, Denby Motor Truck Company of Canada. It was also where the Hyslop and Ronald steam fire engine manufacturer was located; the factory would be taken over by Chatham Motor Car. In addition, it hosted meat packer O'Keefe and Drew.

The Hawaiian pizza is claimed to have been invented in Chatham in 1962 at the Satellite Restaurant by Sam Panopoulos. In the U.S., former Ohio Governor Jim Rhodes proposed building a bridge across Lake Erie linking Cleveland to the southern coast of Kent County.

Before 1998, Kent County consisted of the townships of Camden, Chatham, Dover, Harwich, Howard, Orford, Raleigh, Romney, Tilbury East and Zone. In some of Canada's earliest post-Confederation censuses, some residences in Kent County were incorrectly reported as being in Bothwell "County", which was a separate electoral district comprising parts of Kent and Lambton counties but not a distinct county in its own right.

In 1998, the County of Kent and the city of Chatham were amalgamated by the Province of Ontario to form the Municipality of Chatham–Kent. Most services were also combined. Since then, bus service has begun to serve all of Chatham-Kent. Starting in 2007, routes were set up to include the former towns of Wallaceburg and Dresden. Before 1998, each town had their own fire department. It then became the Chatham-Kent Fire Department upon amalgamation. The county also had separate police departments until 1998. The city of Chatham, as well as the towns of Wallaceburg, Dresden, and Tilbury, each had their own departments. The Chatham-Kent Police Service was formed on September 1, 1998. Many residents opposed amalgamation, as 18 city councillors boycotted the official vote, and the final decision to amalgamate was imposed on the County by a provincial commissioner. In a study on amalgamations in Ontario from 2003, 48% of respondents in Chatham-Kent felt the value they received as taxpayers became worse after amalgamation, and 64% of respondents still did not think of the community as "the Municipality of Chatham-Kent."

Chatham-Kent has many historic festivals throughout the year, such as the Battle of Longwoods reenactment, which takes place on Labour Day weekend at Fairfield Museum on Longwoods Road. Chatham Kent is also home to many historic buildings which are part of an annual ghost tour offered each year at Halloween. The participants go on a guided walk of downtown while the guide informs them of various ghost stories tied to the local buildings in which they pass. Chatham-Kent was a major part of the Underground Railroad and as such hosts the Buxton Homecoming each September. This celebrates the areas black culture and the roots laid by early black settlers in the Buxton area.

Communities
The Municipality of Chatham-Kent currently consists of the following communities, listed by the Townships of the former Kent County (pre-1998 amalgamation):

 Camden Township:
 Dresden, Thamesville; Croton, Dawn Mills, North Thamesville; Wabash; Oakdale
 Chatham Township:
 Chatham, Wallaceburg; Appledore, Arkwood, Darrell, Eberts, Kent Bridge, Louisville, Oldfield, Thornecliffe, Tupperville, Turnerville, Whitebread; Ennett, Riverside
 Dover Township:
 Mitchell's Bay, Pain Court; Bagnall, Baldoon, Bearline, Bradley, Dover Centre, Electric, Grande Pointe, Oungah; Bass Haven
 Harwich Township:
 Blenheim, Erieau, Shrewsbury; Bates Subdivision, Eatonville, Erie Beach, Fargo Station, Guilds, Huffman Corners, Kent Centre, Lake Morningstar Estates, McKay's Corners, Mull, New Scotland, Northwood, Pinehurst, Raglan, Rondeau Bay Estates, Troy, Van Horne, Vosburg, Wilson's Bush; Blenheim Junction, Lynnwood Subdivision, Porkies Corners, Richardson Station, Rushton's Corners
 Howard Township:
 Morpeth, Ridgetown; Beechwood, Botany, Selton; Slabtown, Trinity
 Orford Township:
 Highgate; Clearville, Duart, Muirkirk, Palmyra, Turin; Austen's, Clachan, Henderson's, Lee's
 Raleigh Township:
 Charing Cross; Dealtown, Doyles, North Buxton, Ouvry, Pardoville, Prairie Siding, Rhodes, Ringold, Sleepy Hollow, South Buxton; Sandison, Southside Estates; Cedar Springs
 Romney Township:
 Wheatley; Coatsworth, Port Alma, Renwick; Holiday Harbour
 Tilbury East Township:
 Merlin, Tilbury; Fletcher, Glenwood, Jeannette, Jeannette's Creek, Port Crewe, Quinn, Stevenson, Stewart, Valetta
 Zone Township:
 Bothwell; Bothwell Station, Briarwood Estates; Fairfield, Zone Centre

Geography
At , Chatham-Kent is the 12th largest municipality by area in Canada and the largest in southwestern Ontario.  Over 44,000 of the 107,000 residents live in the former City of Chatham.  Other population centres in the municipality include Wallaceburg, Blenheim and Tilbury, Ridgetown and Dresden.

The Lower Thames River runs through Chatham–Kent to Lake St. Clair in the west, while the Sydenham River flows through Wallaceburg and Dresden.  The municipality has approximately 88 kilometres of shoreline along lake Erie and 24 kilometres along lake St. Clair.

The Indian reserve of Bkejwanong (commonly referred to as Walpole Island) borders on Chatham–Kent, whereas the Indian reserve of Moravian 47 is an enclave within the city and is part of the Chatham–Kent census agglomeration and census division.

Climate

Chatham-Kent has a humid continental climate (Köppen climate classification Dfa), with cold, snowy winters and warm to hot, humid summers. A typical summer will feature heat waves with temperatures exceeding  often. Winters are cold, and feature occasional cold snaps bringing temperatures below , but also commonly include mild stretches of weather above freezing.

Adjacent counties and municipalities
 Lambton County (north and northwest)
 Middlesex County (northeast)
 Elgin County (northeast and east)
 Across Lake Erie: the City of Cleveland and Cuyahoga, Lorain and Erie Counties, Ohio, US (south)
 Essex County (southwest and west)
 Across Lake St. Clair: Macomb and St. Clair Counties, Michigan, US (west)

Demographics 

Ethnicity  

Note: Totals greater than 100% due to multiple origin responses.

2006 census
For all groups that comprise at least 1% of the population. Note that a person can report more than one ethnic origin.
"Canadian": 34.7%
English: 32.9%
French: 21.9%
Scottish: 20.2%
Irish: 19.1%
German: 12.2%
Dutch: 11.1%
Belgian: 5.9%
First Nations: 3.1%
Italian: 2.1%
African descent: 2.1%
Polish: 2.1%
Ukrainian: 2.0%
Welsh: 1.5%
Czech: 1.4%
Metis: 1.2%
American (modern immigrant): 1.2%
Hungarian: 1.2%
Portuguese: 1.2%
Mexican: 1.0%

Language
Although most of the population of Chatham-Kent is English-speaking, a few of its communities and Catholic parishes were settled by francophone (French-speaking) farmers in the mid-nineteenth century. These include Pain Court, Tilbury and Grande Pointe, where French is still spoken by a significant percentage of the population. These communities are designated French language service areas under Ontario's French Language Services Act.

Approximately 8,500 residents of Chatham-Kent have French as a mother tongue and 1,500 have French as their home language. Essex County also has a relatively large francophone population, especially in the municipality of Lakeshore. Together, Chatham–Kent and Essex Counties make up one of the concentrations of Franco-Ontarians in the province of Ontario.

Both elementary and secondary francophone schools exist across the municipality. A French cultural organization, La Girouette, which is based in Pain Court, promotes French-Canadian culture and language in the area.

Knowledge of official language statistics:
English only: 92.2%
French only: <0.1%
English and French: 7.2%
Neither English nor French: 0.5%

Economy and industry
Chatham–Kent's economy has a base in the agricultural and automotive sectors. The municipality and senior levels of government are keen to promote continuing diversification.  The CP railway splits Chatham city in two, and the unstaffed Chatham railway station attends to Via Rail passengers.

Agribusiness and chemical
At the outskirts of Chatham is the headquarters for Pioneer Hi-Bred Limited (a division of DuPont), a major agricultural seed breeding and biotechnology company.

GreenField Specialty Alcohols Inc.'s Commercial Alcohols division, Canada's largest ethanol plant and one of the world's largest, opened in Chatham in 1996. The plant produces ethanol for industrial, medical, and beverage uses. 
 
There are a number of vineyards in the municipality.

Automotive

Chatham's roots in the automotive sector go back to Gray-Dort Motors Ltd., one of Canada's earliest automobile manufacturers. In the 21st century, auto industry plants in the municipality include Autoliv Canada in Tilbury (airbags), Mahle in Tilbury (emissions controls and plastics), in Ridgetown (automotive electronic pedal assembly and sensors), Dana Canada in Chatham (heat shields for thermal and acoustic management of exhaust manifolds, catalytic converters, and turbochargers), and Continental Corporation (Powertrain Canada ULC) in Chatham (design, development, and testing of Actuators for clean, efficient vehicles).

Chatham-Kent also is home to RM Auctions, a vintage automobile auction house, and RM Restorations, a vintage automobile restoration company. The nickname "The Classic Car Capital of Canada"comes from the abundance of classic car events in the community.

Energy
Chatham is home to a major corporate office of Enbridge Gas Inc., a natural gas utility and Enbridge company. Other energy related companies include wind farms near the shores of Lake Erie.

Public sector
The Canadian Federal government is one of the largest employers in the Chatham-Kent area with over 450 employees in several departments in the area.
The Canada Pension Plan (CPP) Disability Unit is housed in the Judy Lamarsh (see Notable Residents) Building in downtown Chatham.  This federal office is the single largest disability processing centre in Canada, processing 50% of all CPP Disability benefits. The office also processes Old Age Security benefit claims.

Retail hub
Chatham serves as a retail centre for the municipality and surrounding area. This includes the large big-box stores in Super Centre on St. Clair Street and arguably the north end of Communication Road in Blenheim.

Attractions

The long, white sandy beaches, fishing, hiking trails and conservation areas make Erieau a popular vacation spot.

There are two Provincial Parks in Chatham-Kent: Rondeau Provincial Park and Wheatley Provincial Park,
There are also numerous local conservation areas.

Downtown Chatham is home to the annual "Retrofest" organized by the Historic Downtown Chatham BIA, in partnership with the Kent Historic Auto Club. Hundreds of classic car enthusiasts travel to downtown Chatham to showcase their classic cars and vintage vehicles.

Downtown Chatham is also home to the Chatham Capitol Theatre, a theatre that, when it opened in 1930, was the largest in the region. The theatre is run by the Municipality of Chatham-Kent and hosts world class shows and entertainers.

Chatham was home to the iconic Wheels Inn, a family resort for four decades until its closure in 2010. In 2011, the Chatham-Kent John D. Bradley Convention Centre was constructed on the site of the Wheels Inn. In July 2019, a new Cascades casino was opened in Chatham, close to the Convention Centre on Richmond Street.

Arts and culture 
Chatham-Kent boasts a rich visual culture throughout the entirety of the municipality. Both the Thames Art Gallery and ARTspace, located in the historic downtown, feature exhibitions showcasing local artists from the Chatham-Kent area, while also housing other Canadian and international works.

Health care
Chatham-Kent is served by the Chatham-Kent Health Alliance. The Public General Hospital and St. Joseph Hospital in Chatham were moved to a single campus in 2004, while the former Sydenham District Hospital remains in Wallaceburg. The eastern portion of the municipality is served by the Four Counties Health Services in Newbury in nearby Middlesex County.

Research published in 2002 by the Heart and Stroke Foundation cited Chatham-Kent as a hotspot for heart disease in Ontario. Further research is underway to determine the reasons for this and other hotspots. The Chatham-Kent Public Health Unit launched a campaign in fall 2007 to tackle other ailments prevalent throughout the community, including asthma, chronic allergies, sinus problems, many types of cancer, diabetes, inflammatory bowel disease, alcoholism, and obesity.

In October 2008, Chatham-Kent Health Alliance was named one of "Canada's Top 100 Employers" by Mediacorp Canada Inc., and was featured in Maclean's newsmagazine.

Chatham-Kent features one of the 14 provincial Local Health Integration Networks (LHIN). The Erie St. Clair (ESC) LHIN services the Chatham-Kent Community as well as Sarnia/Lambton and Windsor/Essex. The ESC LHIN is located in the town of Chatham.

Media

Television stations

Chatham-Kent is also served by stations coming from Windsor, London, Detroit, Toledo, and Cleveland.

Radio broadcast stations

Print media
The Chatham Daily News is the only daily newspaper in Chatham-Kent.  There are several weeklies located in Chatham and the various communities in the municipality, including the Chatham Voice, Wallaceburg Courier Press, the Blenheim News Tribune, Chatham-Kent This Week, Ridgetown Independent News, Tilbury Times, and the Wheatley Journal.

The Chatham Daily News, Chatham-Kent This Week, and Wallaceburg Courier Press are all owned by Postmedia.

Online media
The Chatham Daily News, Chatham-Kent This Week, Wallaceburg Courier Press, Chatham Voice and CKReview are daily online news media in Chatham-Kent with coverage of local news, sports, entertainment, and cultural events as well as a number of regular contributing columnists. The Chatham-Kent Sports Network is an online source covering local sports news, scores, and highlights from each of Chatham-Kent's communities. CKSN also follows Chatham-Kent athletes who have progressed to the Junior, College, International, or Professional ranks.

Education

Elementary and secondary

There are two anglophone school boards and one francophone school board in Chatham–Kent. These are the Lambton Kent District School Board (headquartered in both Chatham and Sarnia), the St. Clair Catholic District School Board (headquartered in Wallaceburg) and the Conseil scolaire catholique Providence (CSC Providence). The LKDSB is a public school board, and consists of 13 secondary and 53 elementary schools. Chatham-Kent Secondary School is the largest public high school in Lambton-Kent. The St. Clair Catholic board consists of two secondary schools (one in Chatham and one in Sarnia) and 26 elementary schools. There are also independent schools, such as Wallaceburg Christian School and Chatham Christian Schools—an elementary and secondary school in the same building.

The French Catholic board, headquartered in Windsor, has its Chatham-Kent regional office in Pain Court.

Post-secondary
Chatham–Kent is the home of two colleges – St. Clair College and University of Guelph Ridgetown Campus, popularly known as Ridgetown College.

St. Clair College is a satellite of St. Clair College of Windsor. There are two campuses located in the municipality – Thames Campus (located in Chatham) and the Wallaceburg Campus (located in Wallaceburg).  More than 5,000 full-time and 12,000 part-time students attend the college each year.

The Ridgetown Campus of the University of Guelph offers diplomas in agriculture, horticulture, and veterinary technology. It is part of the University of Guelph's Ontario Agricultural College, and formerly known as Ridgetown College of Agricultural Technology.

Sports

Hockey
The Chatham Maroons are a team in the Greater Ontario Junior Hockey League.

There are also four teams in the Great Lakes Junior C Hockey League
 Blenheim Blades
 Dresden Jr. Kings
 Wheatley Sharks
 Wallaceburg Lakers

Other teams in Chatham-Kent include the Chatham Outlaws Girls Hockey Association, the Chatham AAA Cyclones and the AA Kent Cobras.

Rugby Union football
Founded in 2001, the Chatham-Kent Havoc rugby team plays in the Southwest Rugby Union.

Transportation

Road
Chatham-Kent is situated just off Highway 401, connecting Montreal, Toronto, Kitchener-Waterloo, London, and Windsor, Ontario; and Detroit, Michigan via the Ambassador Bridge. Blenheim, Chatham and Wallaceburg are linked with Sarnia, Ontario and the Blue Water Bridge to the United States by Highway 40.

The sections of Highway 2 and Highway 3
(the Talbot Trail) in Chatham–Kent were downloaded by the province in 1998, becoming local roads 2 and 3, but they remain significant through routes and are still locally known by their old names.

The first gas station in Canada to sell E85 fuel to the public is located on Park Avenue East in Chatham.

Rail
Chatham station is served by Via Rail passenger services between Toronto and Windsor, part of the Quebec City – Windsor Corridor with four trips in each direction daily, and the community is served by both the Canadian National Railway and the Canadian Pacific Railway for freight transportation.

Bus

Within Chatham public bus services are provided by CK Transit. Chatham-Kent has an intercity bus service, also provided by CK Transit, between all communities in the municipality except Wheatley.

Air
There is a municipal airport located 14 km south east of Chatham featuring a 1500m paved, lighted runway, with refuelling facilities, tie-down services, pilot training and chartered flights.  The nearest airports served by regional carriers are Windsor and London.

Notable people

 Sally Ainse – Oneida diplomat and fur trader
 Chris Allen – former NHL player with the Florida Panthers
 Doug Anakin – won a gold medal at the 1964 Olympics in the bobsled
 Bill Atkinson – former Major League Baseball relief pitcher
 Courtney Babcock – Olympic distance runner
 Shae-Lynn Bourne – championship figure skater
 T. J. Brodie – NHL hockey player with the Toronto Maple Leafs
 Ernest Burgess – 24th President of the American Sociological Association, author and urban sociologist who is known for his groundbreaking social ecology research
 June Callwood – prominent magazine writer in the 1950s who became an Officer in the Order of Canada in 1986
 Joseph Caron – former High Commissioner to India and former Canadian ambassador to China and Japan
 Bridget Carleton - WNBA Player for the Minnesota Lynx
 Chandra K. Clarke – entrepreneur, published author, and humour columnist
 James Couzens – U.S. Senator, Mayor of Detroit, industrialist, philanthropist, and vice president and general manager of the Ford Motor Company
 Robertson Davies – novelist, playwright
 Kenne Duncan – western/action movie actor
 Andy Fantuz – former CIS offensive MVP, former slotback for the Saskatchewan Roughriders and Hamilton Tiger Cats of the CFL
 Wally Floody – the "Tunnel King" from The Great Escape
 Dave Gagner – retired NHL hockey player; brother-in-law of Diane Gagner; former Chatham–Kent mayor
 W. B. George (1899–1972), president of the Canadian Amateur Hockey Association and agriculturalist at Kemptville Agricultural School, was born in Highgate
 Ashley Goure – Paralympic sledge hockey player
 Lee Giffin – professional ice hockey player
 Frank Gross, philanthropist; awarded the Ontario Medal for Good Citizenship in 2006
 Ken Houston (born September 15, 1953) – former NHL player
 Tracey Hoyt – actress, Aurora Farqueson on the CBC Television series The Tournament
 Jeff Jackson – NHL hockey player
 Ferguson Jenkins – Baseball Hall of Famer
 Anna H. Jones – teacher, speaker at the First Pan-African Conference in 1900
 Ryan Jones – former finalist of 2008 Hobey Baker Award and former member of the Edmonton Oilers; currently playing in the DEL for the Cologne Sharks
 Judy LaMarsh – former Canadian Minister of Health
 Archibald Lampman – one of Canada's finest 19th-century Romantic poets, born Morpeth, Kent County, 1861
Bobbi Lancaster, a medical doctor and trans woman noted for playing in the LPGA Qualifying Tournament in 2013
 Lori Lansens – author of Rush Home Road and The Girls
 Chad Laprise – UFC fighter
 John B. Lee – author, poet and current Poet Laureate of Brantford, Ontario
 Doug Melvin – general manager of the Milwaukee Brewers
 Harry Garnet Bedford Miner – Victoria Cross winner during World War I, born in Cedar Springs
 Dave Nichol – award-winning product marketing expert and former president of Loblaw's
 Geoffrey O'Hara – early 20th-century composer, singer and music professor who was the writer of such popular songs as the 1918 hit "K-K-K-Katy"
 Sam Panopoulos – inventor of the Hawaiian pizza
 Ron Pardo – comic-impressionist; actor for History Bites and voice actor on animated shows like PAW Patrol and World of Quest; from Pardoville
 Ray Robertson – novelist
 Brooklyn Roebuck – 2012 The Next Star; under licence with Sony Music Canada
 Doug Shedden – professional ice hockey coach and former player
 Glen Skov – National Hockey League (NHL) hockey player
 Ron Sparks – award-winning comedian, actor, writer and producer (Video on Trial'')
 Joseph Storey – architect, designer of many local landmarks in the 1950s and 1960s
 Shaun Suisham – Pittsburgh Steelers kicker (formerly with Dallas Cowboys and Washington Redskins)
 Sylvia Tyson –  singer-songwriter, broadcaster, and guitarist who found early fame with her then-husband Ian Tyson in their folk duo Ian and Sylvia
 Todd Warriner – former NHL hockey player picked 4th overall in the 1992 NHL Entry Draft by the Quebec Nordiques
 Derek Whitson – Paralympic sledge hockey player
 Brian Wiseman – 1999 IHL MVP Houston Aeros
 Michelle Wright – country music singer

See also
 List of townships in Ontario
 List of municipalities in Ontario

Notes

References

External links

 

 
1998 establishments in Ontario
Populated places on the Underground Railroad
Single-tier municipalities in Ontario
Southwestern Ontario
Populated places on Lake Erie in Canada